Redknapp is a surname. Notable people with the surname include:

Harry Redknapp (born 1947), manager of various English football clubs (father of Jamie) 
Jamie Redknapp (born 1973), English footballer (son of Harry, ex-husband of Louise) 
Louise Redknapp (born 1974), TV presenter and singer (ex-wife of Jamie)